Ndo or NDO may refer to,

BBC Northern Dance Orchestra, a radio orchestra in the United Kingdom
Daniel Ndo, a prominent practitioner in the theatre of Cameroon
Joseph N'Do, a former Cameroonian footballer
Natural Disaster Organisation, a former name of Emergency Management Australia
Ndo, the traditional marriage ceremony in Okobo, Nigeria. See 
Ndo language, a language spoken in the Democratic Republic of Congo and Uganda
Ndonga dialect (ISO 639:ndo), a Bantu dialect spoken in Namibia and parts of Angola.
NDO, a defunct UK internet service provider
Neurogenic detrusor overactivity or Bladder sphincter dyssynergia, a medical condition affecting the urination reflex
NewDeal Office, now know as GEOS, a computer operating environment, graphical user interface (GUI), and suite of application software.
Nidubrolu railway station, Andhra Pradesh, India (station code: NDO)
Praga NDO, a bus manufactured by Czech company Praga between 1938 and 1948
Swedish National Debt Office, a Swedish government agency dealing with finance